The East Hamilton Avenue Historic District encompasses a 20th-century residential area of Wynne, Arkansas, reflective of its growth between about 1920 and 1940.  It extends along East Hamilton Avenue, between North Falls Boulevard and Killough Road, and includes properties on Eldridge Court.  East Hamilton Avenue, representing the best-preserved area of development from this period, was developed gradually beginning in the late 19th century, and grew from west (near Wynne's downtown) to east.  The oldest house in the district, the Giboney-Robertson-Stewart House, is a Queen Anne Victorian built c. 1895.  Most of the houses were built after 1920, and are predominantly Craftsman, Colonial Revival, and Tudor Revival in character.  There are a few Spanish (Mediterranean) Revival houses, and a few early ranch houses, which were generally built between 1940 and 1950.

The district was listed on the National Register of Historic Places in 2011.

See also
National Register of Historic Places listings in Cross County, Arkansas

References

Victorian architecture in Arkansas
Buildings and structures completed in 1895
Cross County, Arkansas
Historic districts on the National Register of Historic Places in Arkansas
National Register of Historic Places in Cross County, Arkansas